Punta Carena Lighthouse is an active lighthouse, located on the island of Capri on the head of the same name, about  southwest of Anacapri. The lighthouse has been active since 1867; its construction began in 1862.

Description

It consists of an octagonal prism brick tower with lantern and gallery, above a two-story building. The lighthouse was repainted recently  and is now white with red vertical stripes, and the keeper's house in red.

The lighthouse has a rotating view that emits  white light flashes every 3 seconds. The focal plane is located at 73 meters above sea level. The lighthouse has a range of 25 nautical miles (about 46 km), and is therefore defined as an offshore lighthouse. It is a 28 m (92 ft) octagonal masonry tower on a two-story house.

See also
 List of lighthouses in Italy

References

External links

Capri.it
 Servizio Fari Marina Militare 

Lighthouses completed in 1867
Lighthouses in Italy
Buildings and structures in Capri, Campania
1867 establishments in Italy